Klan-Tofla was a commune in central Ivory Coast. It was in the sub-prefecture of Bouaflé, Bouaflé Department, Marahoué Region, Sassandra-Marahoué District.

Klan-Tofla was a commune from March 2008 until March 2012, when it became one of 1126 communes nationwide that were abolished.

Notes

Former communes of Ivory Coast
States and territories disestablished in 2012
2012 disestablishments in Ivory Coast
2008 establishments in Ivory Coast
States and territories established in 2008